The Woodbridge Company Limited is a Canadian private holding company based in Toronto, Ontario. It is the primary investment vehicle for members of the family of the late Roy Thomson, the first Baron Thomson of Fleet. David Binet has been the president and chief executive officer of the company since 2012.

Main holdings
Woodbridge is the principal and controlling shareholder (67,8%) of Thomson Reuters, a multinational media conglomerate. Thomson Reuters was formed in 2008, when the Thomson Corporation acquired Reuters.

In late 2010, Woodbridge sold its 40% interest in CTVglobemedia, a Canadian media company with ownership of the CTV Television Network, to BCE Inc. Woodbridge held the 85% interest in The Globe and Mail newspaper before acquiring the remaining 15% owned by BCE in August 2015.

Ownership
Woodbridge is the primary investment vehicle for members of the family of the late Roy Thomson, the first Baron Thomson of Fleet. David Thomson and his brother, Peter Thomson, became chairmen of Woodbridge in 2006 upon the death of their father, Kenneth Thomson.

In 2015, Canadian Business magazine reported that Sherry Brydsonof Victoria, BC, child of Irma Thomson, one of Roy Thomson's two daughtersholds the largest stake in the family company. It is estimated that she holds 23.47% of the company's shares.

See also
 Markham Airport – owned by the Thomson family via Wings of Flight
 Postmedia Network – the successor to Canwest and Southam Newspapers
 Quebecor Media
 Torstar

References

External links
 Profile of The Woodbridge Company
 Woodbridge buys BCE's 15% stake in The Globe and Mail

Holding companies of Canada
Newspaper companies of Canada
The Globe and Mail
Thomson Reuters
Thomson family